The 2011–12 season was the 85th season in ACF Fiorentina's history and the club's 74th season in the top-flight of Italian football. Fiorentina competed in Serie A, finishing a disappointing 13th, and was eliminated in the round of 16 in the Coppa Italia.

Club

Coaching staff

Players

Squad information
Last updated on 13 May 2012
Appearances include league matches only

Transfers

In

Total spending:  ~€6.7 million

Out

Total income:  ~€111,000

Pre-season and friendlies

Competitions

Overall

Last updated: 13 May 2012

Serie A

League table

Results summary

Results by round

Matches

Coppa Italia

Statistics

Appearances and goals

|-
! colspan=10 style="background:#9400D3; color:#FFFFFF; text-align:center"| Goalkeepers

|-
! colspan=10 style="background:#9400D3; color:#FFFFFF; text-align:center"| Defenders

|-
! colspan=10 style="background:#9400D3; color:#FFFFFF; text-align:center"| Midfielders

|-
! colspan=10 style="background:#9400D3; color:#FFFFFF; text-align:center"| Forwards

|-
! colspan=10 style="background:#9400D3; color:#FFFFFF; text-align:center"| Players transferred out during the season

Goalscorers

Last updated: 10 March 2012

References

ACF Fiorentina seasons
Fiorentina